Beatrix Frances Beauclerk, Duchess of St Albans, Marchioness of Waterford, GBE, DGStJ (25 March 1877 – 5 August 1953), born Lady Beatrix Frances Fitzmaurice, was a member of the Anglo-Irish aristocracy, both by birth and through her two marriages.

Life
Beatrix was a daughter of the 5th Marquess of Lansdowne and his wife Maud. 

She was named after her maternal aunt, Beatrix Frances Lambton, Countess of Durham (born Lady Beatrix Frances Hamilton), Lady Lansdowne's favourite sister.

On 16 October 1897, she married Henry Beresford, 6th Marquess of Waterford (and would be styled as Marchioness of Waterford). Their wedding was a high society affair, noted in contemporary magazines.

The couple had six children:
 Lady Blanche Maud Beresford (1898–1940), who married Richard Girouard and had children
 Lady Katharine Nora (1899–), who married her first cousin, Sir David Dawnay, and had children
 John Charles de La Poer Beresford, 7th Marquess of Waterford (1901–1934)
 Lady Beatrix Patricia (1902–), who married Lynden Miller and had children
 Lord William Beresford (1905–1973), who married Rachel Page and had children
 Lord Hugh Beresford (1908–1941), who died unmarried while on active service with the Royal Navy during the Second World War

The Marquess died in 1911, and on 19 August 1918, Beatrix remarried, her second husband being Osborne Beauclerk, 12th Duke of St Albans, familiarly known as "Obby", and they set up home at the family's property at Newtown Anner in Northern Ireland. Through this marriage, she became Lady Osborne Beauclerk, but was better known as Beatrix Beauclerk. She became the Duchess of St. Albans when her husband succeeded to the ducal title in 1934.

She was appointed to the Orders of the British Empire (Knight Grand Cross (G.B.E.), 1919) and the Hospital of St. John of Jerusalem (Dame of Grace, D.G.St.J.) These honours were given in recognition of her work as a hospital administrator during the First World War. She died of heart disease; her husband's reaction to her death was greater than friends of the couple had anticipated.

References

1877 births
1953 deaths
English duchesses by marriage
Waterford, Beatrix
Dames Grand Cross of the Order of the British Empire
Dames Grand Cross of the Order of St John
Daughters of British marquesses
Beatrix Beauclerk, Duchess of St Albans
Beatrix
Wives of knights